The Kuskulana Glacier is a glacier in the Wrangell Mountains of Alaska.

Kuskulana is an Indian name given in 1900 by T. G. Gerdine of the US Geological Survey.

See also
 List of glaciers
National Park Service Flyer of Trail along the glaciers with maps and photos
Topo map

Glaciers of Alaska
Glaciers of Copper River Census Area, Alaska
Glaciers of Unorganized Borough, Alaska